Barefoot to Herat  (Pa Berahneh ta Herat) is a 2002 Iranian film by Majid Majidi. It is a documentary about the plight of Afghan refugees just after the 2001 military offensive against the Taliban.

Background
The film was shot primarily at two refugee camps in Western Afghanistan, one called Makaki in a territory controlled by the Northern Alliance. The rest of the film was shot at another camp called Maslakh, in the city of Herat. The camps are makeshift and conditions are inhumane, making them ill-suited for families whose lives have been torn apart by war. Through interviews with peasants, soldiers, children, and the elderly, Majidi finds the human spirit intact, and still in need of joy and memories and dreams.

Awards
2004 FIPRESCI Prize, Greece

Sources
 Synopsis from Cinemajidi.com

External links 
 

2002 films
2000s Persian-language films
Iranian documentary films
Documentary films about refugees
Films directed by Majid Majidi
Documentary films about the War in Afghanistan (2001–2021)
2002 documentary films